

Champions

Major League Baseball
World Series: New York Yankees over Los Angeles Dodgers (4-2); Reggie Jackson, MVP

American League Championship Series MVP: None
National League Championship Series MVP: Dusty Baker
All-Star Game, July 19 at Yankee Stadium: National League, 7-5; Don Sutton, MVP

Other champions
College World Series: Arizona State
Japan Series: Hankyu Braves over Yomiuri Giants (4-1)
Big League World Series: Taipei, Taiwan
Little League World Series: Li-Teh, Kaohsiung, Taiwan
Senior League World Series: Taipei, Taiwan
Winter Leagues
1977 Caribbean Series: Tigres del Licey
Dominican Republic League: Tigres del Licey
Mexican Pacific League: Venados de Mazatlán
Puerto Rican League: Criollos de Caguas
Venezuelan League: Navegantes del Magallanes

Awards and honors
Baseball Hall of Fame
Ernie Banks
Martín Dihigo
John Henry Lloyd
Al Lopez
Amos Rusie
Joe Sewell
Most Valuable Player
Rod Carew (AL) Minnesota Twins
George Foster (NL) Cincinnati Reds
Cy Young Award
Sparky Lyle (AL) New York Yankees
Steve Carlton (NL) Philadelphia Phillies
Rookie of the Year
Eddie Murray (AL) Baltimore Orioles
Andre Dawson (NL) Montreal Expos
Woman Executive of the Year (major or minor league): Mary Anne Whitacre, Hawaii Islanders, Pacific Coast League

MLB statistical leaders

Major league baseball final standings

Events

January
January 1 - Milwaukee Brewers pitcher Danny Frisella is killed in a dune buggy accident in Arizona. 
January 2 – Not even a full season into owning the Atlanta Braves, Ted Turner is suspended by Commissioner Bowie Kuhn for tampering with the signing of Gary Matthews.  In addition, the Braves are stripped of their first round selections in the June 1978 baseball draft.  Turner successfully appeals the suspension and the draft picks are reinstated.
January 4 – Mary Shane is hired by the Chicago White Sox as the first woman TV play-by-play announcer.
January 6 - California Angels shortstop Mike Miley is killed in a single-car accident in Baton Rouge, Louisiana.
January 11 - The Chicago Cubs trade pitcher Mike Garman and outfielder Rick Monday to the Los Angeles Dodgers for minor league pitcher Jeff Albert, first baseman Bill Buckner and infielder Ivan DeJesus.
January 19 – The Baseball Writers' Association of America elects Ernie Banks to the Baseball Hall of Fame in his first year of eligibility.
January 20 -The Baltimore Orioles trade outfielder Paul Blair to the New York Yankees in exchange for outfielders Elliott Maddox and Rich Bladt. 
January 31 – The Special Veterans Committee selects Joe Sewell, Amos Rusie and Al López for the Hall of Fame.
February 3 – The Hall of Fame's Special Committee on the Negro Leagues picks versatile Cuban star Martín Dihigo and shortstop John Henry Lloyd for induction. The committee then dissolves, its functions being taken over by the Veterans Committee.

February
February 2 - Fritz Peterson, who gained notoriety as a member of the New York Yankees when he and teammate Mike Kekich swapped wives and families, is released by the Texas Rangers, ending his major league career.
February 3 – The Negro League Committee elects Martín Dihigo and John Henry Lloyd to the Baseball Hall of Fame. Dihigo, a dominant pitcher born in Cuba, also is one of just two players to be inducted to the Cuban, Dominican Republic, Mexican Baseball and Venezuelan Halls of Fame, being the other Willie Wells. Lloyd, a standout shortstop and prolific hitter, played in the Negro Leagues from 1906 through 1932, and is also a member of the Cuban and Mexican Halls of Fame.
February 5 - The Chicago Cubs trade pitcher Darold Knowles to the Texas Rangers for a player to be named later. Outfielder Gene Clines is later sent to Chicago to complete the deal. 
February 16 - The Chicago Cubs trade outfielder Champ Summers to the Cincinnati Reds for outfielder Dave Schneck
February 18- The New York Yankees trade Sandy Alomar to the Texas Rangers for infielders Brian Doyle and Greg Pryor. 
February 24 - The Oakland A's trade infielder Ron Fairly to the Toronto Blue Jays for minor league infielder Mike Weathers. The move puts in motion Fairly becoming the first major league to play for both Canadian franchises. Fairly years prior had been a member of the Montreal Expos.

March
March 2 - Ed Farmer is signed by the Baltimore Orioles.
March 17 - A Federal Court rules in favor of MLB Commissioner Bowie Kuhn's decision to void The Oakland A's deals that saw the team sell the contract of Rollie Fingers and Joe Rudi to the Boston Red Sox for two million dollars and the sale of Vida Blue to the New York Yankees for 1.5 million dollars in the best interest of baseball. A's owner Charlie Finley had sued major league baseball to allow the deals to go through. 
March 18 - The Minnesota Twins sign free agent pitcher Geoff Zahn
March 21 – Mark Fidrych, the 1976 AL Rookie of the Year, rips the cartilage in his left knee shagging fly balls in the outfield and will undergo surgery in ten days.  Fidrych would pitch parts of the next four seasons, but the injury would wind up being too much to overcome.
March 26 - The Boston Red Sox release popular infielder Rico Petrocelli. Instead of signing with another team, Petrocelli opts to retire from baseball.
 The Seattle Mariners release Kurt Bevacqua.
March 28 – While in Orlando, Florida for an exhibition game with the Minnesota Twins, the Texas Rangers' Lenny Randle walks up to Rangers manager Frank Lucchesi during batting practice and says he wanted to talk to him. Words are exchanged, and Randle punches Lucchesi, who was still in street clothes, in the face. Lucchesi is hospitalized for a week, needing plastic surgery to repair his fractured cheekbone which Randle breaks in three places. He also receives bruises to his kidney and back. The Rangers suspend Randle for 30 days without pay and fined him $10,000. Randle is charged with assault, and would plead no contest to battery charges in a Florida court, getting slapped with a $1,050 fine.
 The Cincinnati Reds trade outfielder Joel Youngblood to the St. Louis Cardinals in exchange for pitcher Bill Caudill.
March 30 - The Cleveland Indians release Boog Powell.

April
April 6 – The Seattle Mariners open their existence and their home stadium, the Kingdome, with a 7-0 loss to the California Angels.
April 7 – In keeping his promise, Frank Sinatra sings the Star-Spangled Banner on Opening Day at Dodgers Stadium. Sinatra had made the promise to Tommy Lasorda that he'd sing the song if Lasorda ever became manager of the Los Angeles Dodgers. 
 The Toronto Blue Jays play their first game in franchise history, in the snow, defeating the Chicago White Sox 9-5 at Exhibition Stadium.
April 9 - Angered at his teams poor play, San Diego Padres owner Ray Kroc takes to the P.A. system that thank the fans in attendance and call the players out for their poor play.
April 12 - The Detroit Tigers trade Willie Horton who'd played for the team since 1963, to the Texas Rangers for pitcher Steve Foucault. 
April 15 – The Montreal Expos play their first game at Montreal's Olympic Stadium before a crowd of 57,592, as the visiting Philadelphia Phillies win 7-2.
April 17 - Umpires Terry Tata, Ed Sudol, Dick Stello, and Bruce Froemming, walk off the field in protest after The video screen at Fulton County Stadium shows video of a controversial playing involving Bob Watson of the Houston Astros scoring at home in a close play. The crew returns to the field after they are promised the event will not happen again.
April 24 – Canadian Ferguson Jenkins throws the first shutout ever in Exhibition Stadium, as the visiting Boston Red Sox defeat the Toronto Blue Jays 9-0.
April 25 - The Cincinnati Reds defeat the Atlanta Braves 23-9. The Reds score 12 runs in one inning and outfielder George Foster scores five runs, and drives in seven. 
April 26 – Before completing his suspension with the Texas Rangers, Lenny Randle is traded to the New York Mets for a player to be named later.
April 27 - The New York Yankees acquire Mike Torrez from the Oakland A's in exchange for pitcher Dock Ellis, Larry Murray and infielder Marty Perez. While Torrez would only spend one season in pinstripes, he'd be a part of Yankees lore the following season when he surrendered Bucky Dent's home run that helped the Yankees defeated int Red sox in the win and get in play off game.
 Garry Templeton of the St. Louis Cardinals scores five runs in a game, setting a team record as the Cardinals routed the Chicago Cubs at Wrigley Field 20-3.

May
May 9 - On a nationally televised ABC's Monday Night Baseball game between the St. Louis Cardinals and the Cincinnati Reds, Al Hrabosky, the "Mad Hungarian", loads the bases in the 8th inning with the score tied 5-5, but then proceeds to strike out George Foster, Johnny Bench, and Bob Bailey to the delight of the fans at Busch Stadium.  The Cardinals win 6-5 on a walk off home run by Ted Simmons in the home half of the 10th.
 The Toronto Blue Jays defeat the Seattle Mariners 10-4 at Exhibition Stadium. This marked the first on field meeting between the two expansion teams.
May 11 – Atlanta Braves owner Ted Turner fires manager Dave Bristol and names himself manager before a game against the Pittsburgh Pirates. The Braves lose 2-1, their 17th consecutive loss. Turner is then ordered by National League president Chub Feeney to desist, and soon after, owners are banned from managing. Coach Vern Benson manages the Braves the next night to a 6-1 win, breaking the streak.  Meanwhile, Bristol is reinstated as manager for the remainder of the season.
 The California Angels trade first baseman Bruce Bochte and pitcher Sid Monge to the Cleveland Indians for pitchers Dave LaRoche Dave Schuler
May 14 – Jim Colborn throws a no-hitter as the Kansas City Royals defeat the Texas Rangers 6-0. Colborn is the first Royal to pitch a no-hitter at Royals Stadium, later renamed Kauffman Stadium.
May 17 – The Mets' Tom Seaver pitches his fifth career one-hitter, a 6-0 shutout of the Chicago Cubs. Seaver's no-hit bid is broken up by Steve Ontiveros on a bloop single in the fifth.
May 25 – In a Fenway Park double-header, centerfielder Lyman Bostock of the Minnesota Twins ties a major league record with twelve putouts. Recording seventeen putouts over both games, Bostock sets an American League record.
May 27 - Mark Fidrych returns from the injured list and pitches a complete game at home for the Detroit Tigers, but loses 2-1.
May 28 - The Seattle Mariners purchase the contract of pitcher Tom House from the Boston Red Sox.
May 30 – At age 22, pitcher Dennis Eckersley fires a no-hitter as the Cleveland Indians top the California Angels 1-0. Eckersley walks one batter and strikes out 12.

June
June 1 - Pitcher Jim Bouton is released by the Chicago White Sox without ever appearing in a game for the team.
June 3 - Leading by two runs in the bottom of the ninth inning, The Baltimore Orioles escape a no-out loaded bases jam when John Wathan hits into a run-scoring triple play to end the game, giving the team a 7-6 victory over Kansas City at Royals Stadium. The Kansas City pinch-hitter's sac fly to right field is the first out, but scores Al Cowens from third base, however Freddie Patek, the runner on first, is caught in a run-down on the throw (2) and Dave Nelson, stranded off third base, is tagged out (3) by Mark Belanger, completing the 9-6-4-6 triple play.
June 5 - During Old-timer's day, the Los Angeles Dodgers retired the number 24 in honor of former manager Walter Alston
June 7 – The Chicago White Sox select Harold Baines with the number one pick in the 1977 MLB Draft. White Sox owner Bill Veeck had first seen Baines play Little League ball and had followed his career. Pitcher Bill Gullickson is taken with the second pick by the Montreal Expos, and the Milwaukee Brewers take University of Minnesota infielder Paul Molitor with the third pick. Danny Ainge, a potential pro basketball player, is picked in the 15th round by the Toronto Blue Jays.
June 8 – For the fourth time in his career, Nolan Ryan strikes out 19 batters in a game, doing so against the Toronto Blue Jays.
June 12 - Before a crowd of only 10,439 at The Astrodome in Houston, the New York Mets beat The Houston Astros 3-1. It was Tom Seaver who picked up the win and go 7-3 for the season. It would be 6 years until Seaver won a game again for the New York Mets.
June 14 - The New York Mets sign amateur free agent Jeff Reardon.
June 15 – The New York Mets trade Tom Seaver to the Cincinnati Reds for Pat Zachry, Doug Flynn, Steve Henderson and Dan Norman. They then trade Mike Phillips to the St. Louis Cardinals for Joel Youngblood, and send Dave Kingman to the Padres for minor league pitcher Paul Siebert and Bobby Valentine, who will one day manage the Mets. This would forever be known in Mets lore the "Midnight Massacre"
June 16 - The Los Angeles Dodgers purchase the contract of pitcher Bobby Castillo from the Kansas City Royas. Castillo would later go one to be known as the pitcher who helped Fernando Valenzuela learn how to throw a screwball. 
June 17 - Joe Torre is released by the New York Mets.
June 18 – In the sixth inning of an NBC-televised game against the Boston Red Sox at Fenway Park, New York Yankees manager Billy Martin pulls right fielder Reggie Jackson and replaces him with Paul Blair after Jackson misplays Jim Rice's fly ball for a double. As Jackson returns to the dugout, he and Martin exchange words, Martin arguing that Jackson had shown him up by "not hustling" on the play. The Yankee manager lunges at Jackson (who is 18 years younger than Martin and outweighs him by about 40 pounds), and has to be restrained by coaches Yogi Berra and Elston Howard—with the NBC cameras showing the confrontation to the entire country. The Red Sox win, 10-4.
June 20 - On ABC's Monday Night Baseball, the Detroit Tigers' Mark Fidrych beats the Yankees 2-1 at home, allowing 3 hits, no walks, and striking out nine.
June 21 – Frank Lucchesi is fired as manager of the Texas Rangers with a 31-31 record following a 9-5 loss to the Minnesota Twins. Lucchesi blames former Ranger Lenny Randle, with whom he got into a confrontation during Spring training, for the firing, and sues him for $200,000.
June 22 -- Eddie Stanky replaces Lucchesi as Rangers manager. He wins the game, and then surprisingly resigns as manager a mere 18 hours after being hired, one of the shortest tenures in MLB history.
June 24 - After hitting what appears to be a three-run homer in the third inning at Metropolitan Stadium, Ralph Garr is called out for passing teammate Jim Essian, who waited at first base to make sure the ball cleared the fence. The umpires award the White Sox outfielder, known as the Road Runner, a two-run single, but the mistake proves costly when Chicago loses the game in Minnesota, 7-6.
June 25 - A group of former Cubs flatten the Hall of Famers 5-1 in a pregame exhibition. The ex-Cubs included the likes of Billy Jurges, Stan Hack, and Ron Santo. The 24 Hall of Famers that day includes the greatest collection outside of Cooperstown. Men like Joe DiMaggio, Ralph Kiner and Warren Spahn played at Wrigley Field one last time. In the regular game, The Cubs scored four runs in the ninth to overtake the Mets, 5-4. The win improves the Cubs record to 44-22, seven games over Pittsburgh.
June 26 - Pete Vukovich pitches the first shutout in Toronto Blue Jay history, blanking Baltimore at Memorial Stadium, 2-0.
 On Rod Carew Night, the Twins’ first baseman goes 4-for-5 en route to scoring five runs and collecting six RBIs in Minnesota's 19-12 victory over the White Sox at Metropolitan Stadium.
June 27 – The San Francisco Giants' Willie McCovey smashes two home runs, one a grand slam off reliever Joe Hoerner, in the sixth inning to pace a 14–9 victory over the Cincinnati Reds. McCovey becomes the first player in major league history to twice hit two home runs in one inning (his first time was on April 12, 1973), and also becomes the all-time National League leader with 17 career grand slams. Andre Dawson, in both 1978 and 1986, will be the next player to hit two homers in the same inning.
 After offering the job to Twins legend Harmon Killebrew, the Rangers hire Billy Hunter as the team's manager, making him the club's fourth skipper in one week. Texas had replaced the fired Frank Lucchesi with Eddie Stanky, who left after one game, resulting in third base coach Connie Ryan, who refused to assume the position full-time, becoming the interim manager for six games.
June 28 - Before a crowd of only 18,955 at Montreal's Olympic Stadium, The Chicago Cubs beat The Montreal Expos 4-2. Rick Reuschel was the winning pitcher going 11-2 while Bruce Sutter picked up his 21st save of the season. The victory was the high mark for the Cubs as they had a 47-22 record, eight and a half games over Pittsburgh.
June 29 – Willie Stargell hits his 400th career home run helping the Pittsburgh Pirates beat the St. Louis Cardinals 9-1.
June 30 - Cliff Johnson joins Joe DiMaggio and Joe Pepitone as the only players in Yankee history to hit two home runs in the same inning. The designated hitter goes deep twice in the eighth as the Bronx Bombers score eight runs in an 11-5 win over the Blue Jays.

July
July 2 - Jim Spencer, for the second time that season, ties the club record set by Shoeless Joe Jackson in 1920, when he collects eight RBIs, duplicating a feat he first accomplished in May against the Indians. The White Sox first baseman's two home runs help to beat the Twins at Comiskey Park, 13-8.
July 3 - On his 24th birthday, Angel left-hander Frank Tanana tosses his 14th consecutive complete game with his 6-4 victory over Oakland at Anaheim Stadium.
July 5 - The Los Angeles Dodgers sign free agent Ron Kittle.
July 6 - After going 1,887 at bats without a home run, Chicago Cubs outfielder Greg Gross hits one off Don Stanhouse of the Montreal Expos.
July 9 – New York Mets third baseman Lenny Randle ends an extra innings marathon with the Montreal Expos at Shea Stadium in the seventeenth inning with a walk off home run off Will McEnaney.
July 13 – The New York Mets trailed the Chicago Cubs 2-1 in the sixth inning when the lights went out as New York City is stricken with a blackout that would last two days. The game was resumed on September 16, with the Cubs winning 5-2.
July 14 - Jim Wynn, aka the Toy Cannon, is released by the New York Yankees. The 5'10" home run hitter would later sign with the Milwaukee brewers to finish his MLB career.
July 19 :
For the first time since  both Chicago teams were in first place at the All-Star break. However the Cubs, who had a 47-22 record at one point, skidded during the second half of the season to a mediocre 81-81 record while the Chicago White Sox, although succeeding in winning 90 games, were quickly overwhelmed by the run-away AL West Division winner Kansas City Royals in September.
In the All-Star Game at Yankee Stadium, the National League defeats the American League for the 14th time in the last 15 encounters. Don Sutton of the Los Angeles Dodgers is named MVP.
July 21 - Sixteen years and two days removed from his MLB debut, Al Downing, best remembered as the pitcher who gave up Hank Aaron's record breaking home run, is released by the Los Angeles Dodgers, ending his MLB career.
July 24 - Mets outfielder Bruce Boisclair drops a two out foul pop up hits by Davey Lopes of the Los Angeles Dodgers. Lopes responds with a game-ending three-run home run off Bob Apodaca. Lopes's ninth-inning homer provide the Dodgers with a 5-3 win and spoil the opportunity for a win for Nino Espinosa, who left the game needing just one more out for a complete-game victory.
July 25 - Pete Rose becomes the all-time hit leader among switch-hitters when he collects his 2,881st career hit, a fourth-inning single off Pete Falcone in the Reds' 9-8 loss to St. Louis at Busch Stadium. Frankie Frisch, had established the record nearly a half-century ago playing with the Giants and the Cardinals.
July 28 - Just two days after pitching a complete game, 3-0 five hit shutout for the Chicago Cubs against the Cincinnati Reds, Rick Reuschel enters the 13th inning in relief of a 15-15 tie game with the Reds and retires two batters to end the top half.  Reuschel then leads off the bottom half with a single and later scores the winning run.

August
August 1 - Willie McCovey extends his own National League record when he hits his 18th career grand slam in the third inning of the Giants' 9-2 victory over Montreal.
August 7 – In the second game of a doubleheader at Wrigley Field, Mick Kelleher of the Chicago Cubs and Dave Kingman the San Diego Padres are involved in a bench-clearing brawl—a melee with a rare mismatch between the two major combatants. The 6-6, 210-pound Kingman, apparently angered over being hit by a Steve Renko pitch leading off the second inning, responds by sliding hard into Kelleher, the Cubs' 5-9, 170-pound second baseman, on George Hendrick's ground ball one batter later. Kelleher responds by jumping onto Kingman's back and pummeling him with blows. Both Kelleher and Kingman are ejected from the game, which the Cubs win 9-4.
August 12 – For the second consecutive day, Manny Sanguillén of the Oakland Athletics foils a no-hit bid with a single hit off the Baltimore Orioles' Jim Palmer, who settles for a two-hit 6-0 victory. Yesterday's hit was off the New York Yankees' Mike Torrez, who finished with a 3-0 two-hitter.
August 17 – Records fall as the Mexican League concludes its season. Ironman reliever Aurelio López of the Mexico City Reds racks up his 30th save to go with a record 19 victories in relief. Veteran Tampico first baseman Héctor Espino hits 14 home runs, raising his career total to 435, a new minor league record. Thirty-eight-year-old Vic Davalillo, the league's top hitter with a .384 batting average, is purchased by the Los Angeles Dodgers.
August 18 - After attending an open tryout for the Chicago White Sox, Kevin Hickey, who received the invitation after a White Sox employee saw Hickey pitch in a local rec softball league,is signed to a contract. Out of the 250 players at the camp, Hickey is the only one that leaves with a contract. 
August 20 – The Kansas City Royals defeat the Boston Red Sox 5-2. Coupled with losses by the Chicago White Sox, Texas Rangers and Minnesota Twins, the Royals gain sole possession of first place in the American League West for the first time all season, and do not relinquish it for the remainder of the season. By their tenth consecutive win on August 26, the Royals have moved from fourth place to three games up on the White Sox and Twins.
August 21 – In front of 46,265 fans at Shea Stadium, Tom Seaver takes the mound against the New York Mets for the first time in his career. His Cincinnati Reds defeat the Mets 5-1.
August 23 – The New York Yankees defeat the Chicago White Sox 8-3 at Comiskey Park. Coupled with a Boston Red Sox loss, the Yankees move into first place for the first time since July 9, and remain atop the American League East for the remainder of the season.
August 27 – Against the New York Yankees, the Texas Rangers' Toby Harrah and Bump Wills become the first players in Major League history to hit back-to-back inside the park home runs.
August 28 – The Padres place Dave Kingman on waivers.
August 29 :
St. Louis Cardinals outfielder Lou Brock steals two bases in a 4–3 loss to the San Diego Padres. It is the 893rd career stolen base for Brock, breaking Ty Cobb's modern record.
Duane Kuiper hits his first and only career home run. He currently holds the live-ball era record for the most career at-bats with exactly one home run.
August 31 :
Hank Aaron's major league mark of 755 career home runs is tied by Sadaharu Oh in Japan. Three days later, Oh will hit his 756th homer to surpass Aaron's total, becoming the most prolific home run hitter in professional baseball history.
 First baseman Boog Powell is released by the Los Angeles Dodgers.

September
September 3 – Sadaharu Oh surpassed Hank Aaron's world record of home runs hit when he hit home run #756.
September 6 – Dave Kingman is claimed off waivers by the California Angels, making them his third team played for in 1977.
September 7 - Jim Dwyer is released by the Chicago Cubs.
September 8 - 	Bruce Sutter of the Chicago Cubs strikes out the first six batters he faces, including three men in the ninth on nine pitches.
September 9 – In the second game of a double header in Boston, the Detroit Tigers debut their new second baseman, Lou Whitaker, and their new shortstop, Alan Trammell. They will play side by side for 19 years to establish a new Major League record for tandem play at those positions.
 - The Cleveland Indians trade former all-star catcher Ray Fosse to the Seattle Mariners for journeyman pitcher Bill Laxton and cash considerations. 
September 10 – Roy Howell hits two home runs, two doubles, and a single, and drives in nine runs, as the Toronto Blue Jays beat the New York Yankees 19–3.
September 14 – At age 38, pitcher Jim Bouton earned a 4–1 win for the Atlanta Braves over the San Francisco Giants. It is his first Major League Baseball victory since 1970, and last, of his major league career. A member of the 1962 World Champions New York Yankees and an All-Star in 1963, Bouton had retired midway through the 1970 season, shortly after the Houston Astros sent him down to the minor leagues. He then became a local sports anchor for New York station WABC-TV, and eventually pitched in the minors and authored the baseball book Ball Four.
September 15 :
Dave Kingman is traded by the California Angels to the New York Yankees for pitcher Randy Stein. Having also played with the New York Mets and San Diego Padres earlier in the season, Kingman becomes the first—and only-- Major League Baseball player to play in all four divisions in one season.  Kingman hit four home runs in his two weeks with the Yankees, but was not eligible for the postseason.
Earl Weaver pulls his Baltimore Orioles from the field citing "hazardous conditions" caused by a small tarp weighed down by bricks covering the bullpen mound. This results in a forfeiture of the game.
September 16 - The Seattle Mariners defeat the Kansas City Royals 4-1, snapping the Royals' sixteen game winning streak.
September 17 - Yankees DH Dave Kingman, with a third-inning round-tripper off Jim Crawford at Tiger Stadium, becomes the first player to homer for four different teams in one season. The much-traveled veteran will hit a total of 26 home runs in 1977 playing for the Mets (9), Padres (11), Angels (2), and the Yankees (4).
September 19 - With two singles in his first two at bats, Ted Cox ties and then breaks Senators' Cecil Travis' 1933 record of five consecutive hits at the start of a career.
September 22 – Bert Blyleven tossed a 6-0 no-hitter for the Texas Rangers against the California Angels at Anaheim Stadium.
September 23 – George Foster blasted his 50th home run of the season off Atlanta's Buzz Capra, becoming the first major leaguer with a 50-HR season since Willie Mays in 1965.
September 27 - At Chicago's Wrigley Field the Philadelphia Phillies beat the Chicago Cubs (who once led the NL East throughout the spring and summer of this year) 15-9 to clinch their second straight National League East Title.
September 29 - Win a 6-3 victory over the Angels at Royals Stadium, Kansas City reaches the 100-win mark for the first time in the nine-year history of the franchise. The eventual American League Western Division champions will finish the regular season with 102 victories.
 Tony LaRussa is released by the St. Louis Cardinals. LaRussa had been playing for the Cardinals triple A New Orleans Pelicans.

October
October 1 – Despite a 10-7 loss to the Detroit Tigers, the New York Yankees clinch their second straight AL Eastern Division title when the Boston Red Sox are beaten 8-7 by the Baltimore Orioles.
October 2 - Dusty Baker of the Los Angeles Dodgers hits his 30th home run of the season off J.R. Richard of the Houston Astros. Baker joins Steve Garvey, Reggie Smith, and Ron Cey as the other Dodgers with over 30 home runs that season, thus making the Dodgers the first team in MLB history to have four players hit over 30 home runs. 
October 5 - Glenn Burke greets Dusty Baker on the dugout steps to congratulate his Dodger teammate for hitting a grand slam against the Phillies in Game 2 of the 1977 NLCS. The greeting, which consists of the two players extending their right arms above their heads and slapping their hands to make a resounding clap, is considered to be the first 'high five' in baseball history.
October 7 – In Game Three of the National League Championship Series at Philadelphia's Veterans Stadium, the Los Angeles Dodgers were down 5-3 with 2 outs in the 9th inning, but the Dodgers catch lightning in a bottle. Pinch-hitter Vic Davalillo beats out a 2-strike drag bunt and scores when pinch-hitter Manny Mota follows with a long double off Greg Luzinski's glove. Mota reaches 3rd on a throw that Ted Sizemore mishandles. Davey Lopes' grounder hits a seam in the carpet and caroms off Mike Schmidt's knee to Larry Bowa, and the shortstop's throw is ruled late although television replays and a scene from a 1977 Philadelphia Phillies highlight film showed that Lopes was out. Mota scored to tie the game at 5-5. The Dodgers pull out a 6-5 victory when Bill Russell singles home Lopes after Lopes advanced to second on a wild pickoff throw by Gene Garber.
October 8 - Tommy John of the Los Angeles Dodgers outduels Steve Carlton of the Philadelphia Phillies for a 4-1 win.
October 18 – In Game Six of the World Series, Reggie Jackson hits three home runs in three swings to lead the New York Yankees to an 8–4, Series-clinching victory. Jackson is named Series MVP.
October 20- Ron Blomberg who was the first designated hitter in the majors, becomes a free agent.
October 25 - Earl Weaver of the Baltimore Orioles was named Associated Press American League Manager of the Year by a landslide vote. Weaver received 248 first place votes. Whitey Herzog of Kansas City Royals was second and Bob Lemon of Chicago White Sox was third.
October 26 - The St. Louis Cardinals purchase the contract of pitcher Aurelio López from the Mexico City Reds of the Mexican League.
October 27 - Calvin Griffith, owner of the Minnesota Twins, rejects manager Gene Mauch's request to resign and take a job as manager with the California Angels. Griffin informed both Mauch and Angels owner Gene Autry that Mauch was under contract to the Twins for three years.

November
November 2 - Steve Carlton won his 2nd Cy Young Award as his 23 wins helped The Phillies reach the postseason for the 2nd straight year, the first time the Phillies had consecutive postseason appearances.
November 9 - George Foster was named the National League MVP after his spectacular 52 home run and 149 RBI season. Greg Luzinski of the Philadelphia Phillies finished second and Dave Parker of the Pittsburgh Pirates finished third.
November 11 - Doc Medich signs as a free agent with the Texas Rangers. 
November 16 - Rod Carew of the Minnesota Twins easily beats Al Cowens of the Oakland A's and Ken Singleton of the Baltimore Orioles in a vote to be named American League MVP.
November 17 - Ron Blomberg, who missed much of the previous season with an injury, is signed to a huge free agent deal by White Sox owner Bill Veeck. The deal was for $500,000 plus and $80,000 bonus. The deal is a bust as Blomberg bats only .231 in 169 plate appearances. 
November 21 - Outfielder Lyman Bostock signs with the California Angels as a free agent. Bostock is killed in a shooting 10 months later. 
November 22 – Andre Dawson of the Montreal Expos wins the National League Rookie of the Year Award by one vote over Steve Henderson of the New York Mets. Dawson hit .282 with 19 home runs and 65 RBI, while Henderson had .297, 12, 65.
  The New York Yankees sign pitcher Goose Gossage to a six-year 2.75 million dollar contract.
November 30 - Dave Kingman signs with the Chicago Cubs, making the Cubs the fifth franchise he was a part of during the Calendar year. Kingman started the season with the Mets, was traded to the Padres, who later released him. He was then signed by the Angels, played there for a week, and was traded to the New York Yankees, where he finished the season.

December
December 5 - The Toronto Blue Jays select Willie Upshaw from the New York Yankees and the Milwaukee Brewers select Ned Yost from the New York Mets in the 1977 Rule Five Draft. 
 The California Angels trade outfielders Bobby Bonds, Thad Bosley and pitcher Richard Dotson to the Chicago White Sox in exchange for piytchers Chris Knapp, Dave Frost, and catcher/outfielder Brian Downing.
December 8 – In an unusual four team, off-season trade, the Atlanta Braves sent Willie Montañez to the New York Mets. Then, the Texas Rangers sent Adrian Devine, Tommy Boggs and Eddie Miller to the Braves; Tom Grieve and a player to be named later to the Mets, and Bert Blyleven to the Pittsburgh Pirates. The Pirates sent Al Oliver and Nelson Norman to the Rangers, and the Mets sent Jon Matlack to the Rangers and John Milner to the Pirates. The Rangers later sent Ken Henderson to the Mets to complete the trade (March 15).
The Boston Red Sox acquire second baseman Jerry Remy from the California Angles in exchange for pitcher Don Aase. 
December 9 - The Oakland Athletics announce a trade of Vida Blue to the Cincinnati Reds for minor-leaguer Dave Revering.
December 14 - In one of baseball worst trades, the Boston Red Sox trade Ferguson Jenkins a future hall of fame player, to the Texas Rangers for pitcher John Poloni. Jenkins goes on to be a star for the Rangers and Poloni never pitches a game in the majors for the Red Sox.

Movies
The Bad News Bears in Breaking Training

Births

January
January 2 – Hansel Izquierdo
January 2 – Scott Proctor
January 3 – A. J. Burnett
January 3 – Mike Crudale
January 3 – Zach Sorensen
January 4 – Brian O'Connor
January 4 – Walter Silva
January 5 – Eric Junge
January 8 – Dave Matranga
January 10 – Rick Bauer
January 12 – Reggie Taylor
January 16 – Colter Bean
January 17 – Rob Bell
January 18 – Franklin Núñez
January 22 – Aaron Rakers
January 23 – Jason Stanford
January 28 – Bob File
January 28 – Lyle Overbay
January 30 – Takahiro Arai
January 30 – John Lindsey

February
February 2 – Adam Everett
February 5 – Javier Martínez
February 5 – Abraham Núñez
February 6 – Pete Zoccolillo
February 7 – Dave Borkowski
February 9 – Napoleón Calzado
February 12 – Gary Knotts
February 13 – Joe Lawrence
February 15 – Álex González
February 17 – Juan Padilla
February 21 – Chad Hutchinson
February 22 – J. J. Putz
February 24 – Bronson Arroyo
February 26 – Mike Muchlinski
February 26 – Josh Towers
February 27 – Craig Monroe

March
March 2 – Jay Gibbons
March 5 – Mike MacDougal
March 6 – Marcus Thames
March 9 – Justin Leone
March 10 – Ben Davis
March 10 – Tike Redman
March 17 – Robb Quinlan
March 18 – Fernando Rodney
March 18 – Terrmel Sledge
March 19 – David Ross
March 20 – Joe Fontenot
March 25 – Brett Jodie
March 27 – Nate Rolison
March 30 – Jeriome Robertson
March 31 – Jamie Brown

April
April 2 – Mike Gallo
April 4 – Eric Valent
April 5 – Winston Abreu
April 6 – Andy Phillips
April 6 – Barry Wesson
April 7 – Jimmy Osting
April 7 – Ben Petrick
April 12 – D. J. Carrasco
April 15 – Paul Phillips
April 19 – Joe Beimel
April 19 – Dennys Reyes
April 19 – George Sherrill
April 21 – Kip Wells
April 23 – Andruw Jones
April 23 – Jason Tyner
April 24 – Carlos Beltrán
April 25 – Hajime Miki
April 26 – Kosuke Fukudome
April 26 – Chris Magruder
April 27 – Orber Moreno
April 28 – Jorge Sosa

May
May 2 – Luke Hudson
May 3 – Ryan Dempster
May 5 – Tom Gregorio
May 6 – Benito Báez
May 13 – Robby Hammock
May 13 – Chris Oxspring
May 14 – Roy Halladay
May 16 – Ivanon Coffie
May 19 – Dan Giese
May 19 – Brandon Inge
May 20 – Steve Stemle
May 24 – Jae Weong Seo
May 25 – Alex Anthopoulos
May 25 – Fernando Lunar
May 27 – Mike Caruso
May 28 – Alex Hernandez

June
June 1 – Brad Wilkerson
June 2 – Wascar Serrano
June 3 – Travis Hafner
June 6 – Mark Ellis
June 7 – Joe Horgan
June 11 – Odalis Pérez
June 11 – Adam Pettyjohn
June 13 – José Ortiz
June 15 – Bret Prinz
June 16 – Kerry Wood
June 19 – Bruce Chen
June 21 – Roger Deago
June 25 – Ryan Kohlmeier
June 27 – Juan Peña
June 28 – Kevin McGlinchy
June 28 – Chris Spurling
June 29 – Tony McKnight
June 29 – Shawn Sedlacek

July
July 6 – Michael Ryan
July 7 – Andy Green
July 8 – Craig House
July 11 – Javier López
July 18 – Glenn Williams
July 22 – Ryan Vogelsong
July 24 – Jason Smith
July 25 – Travis Phelps
July 26 – Joaquín Benoit
July 27 – Kyle Denney

August
August 2 – Julio Mateo
August 3 – Justin Lehr
August 4 – Paxton Crawford
August 5 – Eric Hinske
August 5 – Mark Mulder
August 7 – Tyler Yates
August 8 – Jeremy Hill
August 9 – Jason Frasor
August 10 – Lorenzo Barceló
August 10 – Julio Ramírez
August 13 – Will Ohman
August 14 – Scott Chiasson
August 14 – Juan Pierre
August 15 – Allen Levrault
August 17 – Mike Maroth
August 19 – Matt White
August 20 – Josh Pearce
August 20 – Aaron Taylor
August 26 – Agustín Montero
August 26 – Allan Simpson
August 27 – Justin Miller
August 28 – Tom Shearn
August 29 – Steve Lomasney
August 29 – Roy Oswalt
August 29 – Aaron Rowand
August 30 – Jon Adkins
August 30 – Marlon Byrd

September
September 2 – Yamid Haad
September 3 – Nate Robertson
September 4 – Matt DeWitt
September 4 – Sun-Woo Kim
September 5 – Jason Hart
September 7 – Shane Nance
September 9 – Kyle Snyder
September 10 – Danys Báez
September 10 – Chad Hermansen
September 13 – Grant Roberts
September 15 – Damian Rolls
September 18 – Jody Gerut
September 19 – Mike Smith
September 21 – Brian Tallet
September 23 – Brent Abernathy
September 24 – Pasqual Coco
September 25 – Wil Nieves
September 25 – Chris Piersoll
September 26 – Aaron Myette
September 27 – Vicente Padilla
September 29 – Heath Bell
September 29 – Jake Westbrook

October
October 3 – Eric Munson
October 4 – Bobby Scales
October 9 – Brian Roberts
October 11 – Ty Wigginton
October 15 – Mitch Jones
October 19 – Mario Ramos
October 19 – Randy Ruiz
October 22 – Brad Thomas
October 24 – Rafael Furcal
October 26 – Scott Sobkowiak
October 27 – Onan Masaoka
October 28 – Chen Chin-Feng

November
November 1 – Luis de los Santos
November 4 – Larry Bigbie
November 4 – Marcus Gwyn
November 8 – Nick Punto
November 9 – Peter Bergeron
November 10 – Matt Cepicky
November 11 – Mike Bacsik
November 17 – Alex Graman
November 19 – Justin Duchscherer
November 23 – Adam Eaton
November 26 – John Parrish
November 27 – Willie Bloomquist
November 27 – Raúl Valdés
November 29 – Jason Alfaro
November 30 – Carlos Valderrama

December
December 3 – Chad Durbin
December 6 – Kevin Cash
December 7 – Eric Chavez
December 7 – Saúl Rivera
December 10 – Dan Wheeler
December 12 – Orlando Hudson
December 14 – Doug DeVore
December 14 – Dan Wright
December 18 – José Acevedo
December 21 – Buddy Carlyle
December 21 – D'Angelo Jiménez
December 21 – Freddy Sánchez
December 23 – Shawn Chacón
December 23 – Jesús Colomé
December 24 – Matt Ginter
December 29 – Jimmy Journell
December 29 – Jack Wilson
December 30 – Grant Balfour
December 31 – Chris Reitsma

Deaths

January
January 1 – Mary Carey, 51, All-American Girls Professional Baseball League infielder
January 1 – Danny Frisella, 30, Milwaukee Brewers relief pitcher who posted a 5–2 (2.74 ERA) record with a team-best nine saves in 1976; spent ten years in MLB and saved 57 career games for five teams, notably the New York Mets
January 2 – Max Wilson,  60, left-handed pitcher who worked in 12 games for the 1940 Philadelphia Phillies and 1946 Washington Senators
January 6 – Mike Miley, 23, California Angels shortstop and 1974 first-round draft pick, who played 84 total games for them in 1975 and 1976
January 9 – Howard Lohr, 84, outfielder who played 21 career games for the 1914 Cincinnati Reds and 1916 Cleveland Indians
January 10 – Vic Frazier, 72, pitcher for the Chicago White Sox (1931–1933 and 1939), Detroit Tigers (1933–1934) and Boston Bees (1937); went 23–38 (5.77) in 126 career games
January 11 – Tex Carleton, 70, pitcher who won 100 games, losing 76, for the St. Louis Cardinals (1932–1934), Chicago Cubs (1935–1938) and Brooklyn Dodgers (1940); member of 1934 "Gashouse Gang" world champions and two other National League pennant-winners; as a Dodger, threw a no-hitter against Cincinnati on April 30, 1940
January 11 – Stu Holcomb, 66, college football and basketball coach (Miami of Ohio, Purdue) and athletic director (Purdue, Northwestern) who served from September 1970 into late July 1973 as general manager of MLB's Chicago White Sox
January 13 – Red Ostergard, 80, minor-league outfielder who went 4-for-11 (.364) as a pinch hitter for the 1921 White Sox in his lone MLB stint
January 16 – Jim Hamilton, 54, shortstop/third baseman who played 19 games for the 1946 Kansas City Monarchs of the Negro American League
January 16 – Baby Doll Jacobson, 86, center fielder for the St. Louis Browns and four other American League clubs between 1915 and 1927 who batted .311 lifetime, with 1,714 hits
January 17 – Ernie Wingard, 76, left-handed pitcher who made 145 appearances for 1924–1927 St. Louis Browns
January 19 – Don Hendrickson, 63, relief pitcher who appeared in 39 games for 1945–1946 Boston Braves
January 29 – Hod Ford, 79, infielder for 15 seasons (1919–1933) with five NL teams, principally the Boston Braves and Cincinnati Reds; batted .263 in 1,446 games

February
February 3 – Chi-Chi Olivo, 48, Dominican relief pitcher who worked in 96 games for the Milwaukee/Atlanta Braves in four seasons between 1961 and 1966; brother of Diomedes Olivo (who died on February 15)
February 4 – Nemo Leibold, 84, outfielder in 1,268 games for four AL teams, principally the Chicago White Sox, from 1913 to 1925; batted .300 twice; later a minor league manager
February 7 – Arthur Ehlers, 80, baseball executive; general manager of Philadelphia Athletics (1951–1953) and Baltimore Orioles (1954)
February 8 – Boardwalk Brown, 87, pitcher for the Philadelphia Athletics (1911–1914) and New York Yankees (1914–1915); won 17 games for 1913 world champions, although he did not appear in the World Series
February 15 – Diomedes Olivo, 58, brother of Chi-Chi Olivo and father of Gilberto Rondón; left-handed relief pitcher who broke into the majors at age 41 and appeared in 85 career games for the Pittsburgh Pirates (1960 and 1962) and St. Louis Cardinals (1963); later a Cardinals' scout
February 16 – Rudolph Ash, 76, outfielder who appeared for the Chicago American Giants of the Negro National League in 1920 and the Hilldale Club and Newark Stars of the Eastern Colored League in 1926
February 16 – Ken Nash, 88, who appeared in 35 games as a pinch hitter and infielder for the 1912 Cleveland Naps and 1914 St. Louis Cardinals
February 18 – George Zackert, 92, pitcher in five games for the 1911-1912 Cardinals
February 19 – Mike González, 86, Cuban catcher, coach and manager; his playing career encompassed 17 seasons and 1,042 games played for five National League clubs between 1912 and 1932; coached for St. Louis Cardinals for 13 seasons (1934 to 1946) and twice (in 1938 and 1940) served as acting manager of Redbirds; earned five World Series rings as a Cardinal player and coach; longtime fixture as manager and club owner in Cuban Winter League, and one of the first Latin Americans to forge a long post-playing career in MLB
February 26 – Harry Welchonce, 93, who appeared in 26 games as an outfielder and pinch hitter for the 1911 Philadelphia Phillies

March
March 3 – Tenny Edwards, 73, catcher/infielder in 22 games for the 1937 St. Louis Stars of the Negro American League
March 3 – Stubby Overmire, 57,  left-handed pitcher who appeared in 266 games for three American League clubs, primarily the Detroit Tigers, over a decade (1943–1952); member of 1945 World Series champ Tigers who also fashioned a long, post-playing career as a coach, scout and minor-league skipper for Detroit
March 9 – Spike Merena, 67, pitcher who worked in four contests for the 1934 Boston Red Sox; in three MLB starting assignments, he tossed two complete games and one shutout
March 13 – Hap Glenn, 63, third baseman who played in 20 games for the 1938 Atlanta Black Crackers of the Negro American League
March 28 – Jelly Gardner, 81, outfielder who played a dozen seasons (1920–1931), primarily for the Chicago American Giants; led 1922 Negro National League in stolen bases
March 30 – Barney Olsen, 57, centerfielder who played in 24 games for the 1941 Chicago Cubs

April
April 3 – Hank Steinbacher, 64, outfielder for the Chicago White Sox from 1937 to 1939; batted .331 with 132 hits in 106 games in 1938 
April 4 – Sam Hill, 50, outfielder for the Chicago American Giants of the Negro American League (1946–1948); played in two All-Star games in 1948
April 6 – Frank Rooney, 92, first baseman who appeared in 12 games for the 1914 Indianapolis Hoosiers of the "outlaw" Federal League
April 9 – Roxie Lawson, 70, pitcher who hurled in 208 games for the Cleveland Indians (1930–1931), Detroit Tigers (1933 and 1935–1939) and St. Louis Browns (1939–1940)
April 12 – Philip K. Wrigley, 82, owner of the Chicago Cubs from January 26, 1932, until his death; over those 45 years, his teams won four National League pennants, all between 1932 and 1945; kept arc lights and night games out of Wrigley Field; organized the All-American Girls Professional Baseball League in 1943; served as vice president of the NL from 1947 to 1966; his father and son were his predecessor and successor as Cubs' owner
April 12 – Hal Leathers, 78, middle infielder who played nine games with the 1920 Cubs; contrary to surname, he made seven errors in 43 MLB chances for a poor fielding percentage of .837
April 12 – Tim McCabe, 82, pitcher who went 5–1 (2.92 ERA) in 22 appearances for the 1915–1918 St. Louis Browns
April 14 – Lionel Decuir, 62, catcher who appeared in 37 games in the Negro leagues between 1937 and 1940, 35 of them for the Kansas City Monarchs 
April 19 – Fred Carisch, 95, catcher/first baseman who got into 226 total games for the Pittsburgh Pirates (1903–1906), Cleveland Naps (1912–1914) and Detroit Tigers (1923); coach for the Tigers in 1923–1924
April 22 – Rube Yarrison, 81, pitcher in 21 contests for the 1922 Philadelphia Athletics and 1924 Brooklyn Robins
April 27 – Ernie Neitzke, 82, outfielder (eight games) and pitcher (two games) in 11 contests for the 1921 Boston Red Sox
April 28 – Al Smith, 69, left-handed pitcher who won 99 games for the New York Giants, Philadelphia Phillies and Cleveland Indians (1934–1945); known as starting pitcher who halted Joe DiMaggio's 56-game hitting streak on July 17, 1941; in 1943, won 17 games for Indians and was named to the American League All-Star squad
April 30 – Elam Vangilder, 81, pitcher for 1919–1927 St. Louis Browns and 1928–1929 Detroit Tigers, appearing in 367 total games

May
May 5 – Bill Marshall, 66, second baseman who played for the Boston Red Sox (one game in 1931) and Cincinnati Reds (six games in 1934)
May 8 – Frankie Pytlak, 68, good-hitting catcher who played in 795 games for Cleveland Indians (1932–1940) and Boston Red Sox (1941 and 1945–1946); batted .300 or better four times
May 11 – Johnnie Chambers, 65, pitcher who appeared in two games for the 1937 St. Louis Cardinals
May 11 – Oscar Horstmann, 85, pitcher who worked in 50 games for the 1917–1919 Cardinals
May 13 – Adam DeBus, 84, shortstop/third baseman for the 1917 Pittsburgh Pirates who played in 38 games
May 14 – Lou Maguolo, 77, legendary scout who covered the Midwestern U.S. for the St. Louis Browns and New York Yankees between 1936 and 1975
May 23 – Sam Bohne, 80, infielder who played 663 games for three National League clubs, principally the Cincinnati Reds, in seven seasons spanning 1916 and 1926
May 26 – Johnny Kucab, 57, relief pitcher for the 1950–1952 Philadelphia Athletics, appearing in 59 games; in one of his three career starts, he hurled a complete-game, 5–3 win on October 1, 1950, earning Connie Mack his 3,729th and final victory as a Hall of Fame manager

June
June 2 – Milt Steengrafe, 79, pitcher who appeared in 16 games for the Chicago White Sox in 1924 and 1926
June 10 – Turk Farrell, 43, hard-throwing pitcher who won 106 games, mainly with the Philadelphia Phillies and Houston Astros, over 14 seasons (1956–1969); four-time NL All-Star; biological father of Richard Dotson
June 15 – Big Bill Lee, 67, two-time All-Star pitcher who had a pair of 20-win seasons for the Chicago Cubs (1935 and 1938); in the latter year, led NL in earned run average (2.66); won 169 games over 14 seasons, 11 of them for the Cubs
June 18 – Johnny Frederick, 75, slugger who hit .308 with 85 HR and 377 RBI in six seasons (1929–1934) for the Brooklyn Robins and Dodgers
June 26 – Jack Berly, 74, pitcher for the St. Louis Cardinals (1924), New York Giants (1931) and Philadelphia Phillies (1932–1933) who appeared in 65 MLB games
June 28 – Otto Bluege, 67, middle infielder who appeared in 109 games for the 1931–1932 Cincinnati Reds, then a longtime scout; brother of Ossie Bluege

July
July 11 – Shag Crawford, 60, National League umpire who worked in 3,120 games from 1956 to 1975, plus three World Series and three All-Star games; father of umpire Jerry Crawford
July 16 – Milt Stock, 84, third baseman who played in 1,628 games over 14 seasons (1913–1926) for four National League clubs, including 1915 NL champion Philadelphia, and batted .300 five times; later, both a minor-league manager and executive and an MLB coach; father-in-law of Eddie Stanky
July 20 – James H. Lemon, 74, co-owner and club president of the Washington Senators from 1963 through 1967, and owner/board chairman in 1968, when he sold the club to Bob Short, who moved it to Arlington, Texas, in 1972
July 20 – Red Longley, 67, outfielder, catcher and third baseman who was a stalwart member of the Memphis Red Sox of the Negro American League, playing for them for ten seasons spanning 1937 to 1947
July 27 – Billy Holm, 65, catcher who appeared in 119 MLB games during World War II for the 1943–1944 Chicago Cubs and 1945 Boston Red Sox

August
August 9 – George Milstead, 74, pitcher who worked in 36 total games for 1924–1926 Chicago Cubs
August 12 – Bubber Jonnard, 79, back-up catcher for four clubs in 103 total games spread over six years between 1920 and 1935; later a coach and scout; twin brother of Claude Jonnard
August 16 – Charlie Barnabe, 77, southpaw who was winless in seven decisions over 24 games pitched for the 1927–1928 Chicago White Sox
August 16 – Al Javery, 59, pitcher who hurled in 205 games for the Boston Bees and Braves from 1940 to 1946; two-time (1943 and 1944) National League All-Star
August 16 – Joe Kelly, 90, light-hitting outfielder who batted .224 in 376 career games for three National League clubs (1914, 1916–1919)
August 19 – Bob Klinger, 69, pitcher who compiled a 66–61 record for the Pittsburgh Pirates (1938–1943) and Boston Red Sox (1946–1947); losing pitcher in decisive Game 7 of 1946 World Series
August 19 – Chuck Wortman, 85, weak-hitting shortstop for the Chicago Cubs from 1916–1918 who batted .186 in 161 career games; batted once in 1918 World Series
August 24 – Leo Cristante, 50, relief pitcher who appeared in 30 MLB games for the 1951 Philadelphia Phillies and 1955 Detroit Tigers
August 28 – Silvio García, 63, Cuban shortstop for the New York Cubans of the Negro National League (1936, 1940, 1946–1947); played in four All-Star games during his latter two seasons.
August 30 – Leo Hannibal, 66, who played in 22 games, 18 as a pitcher, for four Negro leagues teams between 1932 and 1938

September
September 2 – Chucho Ramos, 59, Venezuelan outfielder who collected five hits in ten at-bats over four May 1944 games for the Cincinnati Reds
September 7 – Buster Maynard, 64, outfielder who appeared in 224 games over five campaigns (1940, 1942–1943 and 1946) with New York Giants
September 8 – Oral Hildebrand, 70, pitcher who won 83 games over a ten-year (1931–1940), 258-game career for the Cleveland Indians, St. Louis Browns and New York Yankees; chosen to American League squad for the first All-Star game in 1933; member of 1939 World Series champion Yankees
September 14 – Beau Bell, 70, right fielder for St. Louis Browns (1935–1939), Detroit Tigers (1939) and Cleveland Indians (1940–1941) who led AL in hits (218) and doubles (51) in 1937; selected to AL All-Star team that season, and batted .297 lifetime in 767 MLB games; later coached at Texas A&M
September 19 – Paddy Livingston, 97, catcher for Cleveland (1901, 1912) and Philadelphia (1909–1911) of the American League and Cincinnati (1906) and St. Louis (1917) of the National League, getting into 206 career games; at his death, the oldest major leaguer and the only survivor among players who appeared in the AL's inaugural season; member of 1910 World Series champion Athletics
September 24 – Sherm Lollar, 53, seven-time American League All-Star catcher (1950, 1954–1956 and 1958–1960) who won first three Gold Gloves awarded (1957–1959); appeared in 1,752 games over 18 seasons for the Cleveland Indians (1946), New York Yankees (1947–1948, including 1947 World Series champions), St. Louis Browns (1949–1951) and Chicago White Sox (1952–1963) and batted .264 lifetime with 155 homers; later a coach, including service on 1966 Series champion Baltimore Orioles
September 26 – Ernie Lombardi, 69, eight-time National League All-Star catcher (1936–1940, 1942–1943, 1945); played in 1,853 career games for four NL clubs, mainly the Cincinnati Reds and New York Giants, between 1931 and 1947; member of Reds' 1940 World Series champs; batted .306 lifetime with 190 homers; 1938 NL Most Valuable Player; only catcher to win two batting titles (1938 and 1942), he caught Johnny Vander Meer's back-to-back no-hitters in 1938; posthumously elected to the Hall of Fame in 1986
September 30 – Del Pratt, 89, second baseman for four AL teams between 1912 and 1924 who led Junior Circuit in RBI in 1916 with St. Louis Browns; batted over .300 in his last five seasons, and collected 1,996 career hits

October
October 1 – Pat Patterson, 80, third baseman/shortstop who went 14-for-35 (.400) over 23 games in his lone MLB audition with the World Series-bound 1921 New York Giants
October 8 – Clarence Miles, 80, Baltimore attorney and lead member of the ownership group that purchased the St. Louis Browns in September 1953 and moved them to Maryland as the modern Orioles franchise; served as club president in 1954 and 1955 before selling his share of the team
October 10 – Jim Lyle, 77, pitcher who made only one MLB appearance on October 2, 1925 for AL champion Washington Senators but won 212 games in the minor leagues
October 13 – Joe Bratcher, 79, hard-hitting outfielder who batted .331 in a dozen minor league seasons (1920–1931), but played only four MLB games (and went hitless in his one official at bat) for the 1924 St. Louis Cardinals
October 14 – Bing Crosby, 74, actor, singer and sportsman who was a minority owner of the Pittsburgh Pirates from August 1946 until his death
October 17 – Cal Hubbard, 76, umpire in the American League from 1936 to 1951, and supervisor of AL arbiters from 1952 to 1969, who developed modern systems of umpire positioning; NFL defensive tackle from 1927 to 1936; only man to be selected to the Baseball (1976) and Pro Football (1963) halls of fame
October 23 – George Gerken, 74, outfielder/pinch hitter who played 44 games for 1927–1928 Cleveland Indians
October 24 – Bill Lewis, 73, catcher/pinch hitter who batted .327 in 101 at bats in a reserve role for St. Louis (1933) and Boston (1935–1936) of the National League
October 27 – Carlisle Littlejohn, 76, pitcher in 26 games for the 1927–1928 St. Louis Cardinals
October 27 – Red Lynn, 63, pitcher who worked in 85 career games for the Detroit Tigers (1939), New York Giants (1939–1940) and Chicago Cubs (1944)
October 28 – Ralph Cleage, 79, outfielder who appeared in 23 games for the 1924 St. Louis Stars of the Negro National League
October 30 – Bill Drake, 82, pitcher who worked in 190 Negro National League games between 1920 and 1930, principally for St. Louis and Kansas City; led NNL in games lost (14) in 1920 and games won (17) the following year; nicknamed "Plunk" for his willingness to pitch inside

November
November 4 – Pinky Pittenger, 78, backup infielder/outfielder who played from 1921 through 1929 for the Boston Red Sox, Chicago Cubs and Cincinnati Reds
November 8 – Jim Gladd, 55, catcher in four games for the 1946 New York Giants
November 8 – Bob Griffith, 65, pitcher and occasional outfielder who hurled in 105 games in the Negro National League between 1934 and 1948; batted .265 in 135 games played
November 8 – Bucky Harris, 81, Hall of Fame manager of five teams for 29 seasons between 1924 and 1956 who won the third-most games (2,157) in history; managed Washington Senators for 18 seasons over three terms, winning 1924 World Series as "Boy Wonder" rookie skipper; led Yankees to 1947 title; also won AL pennant in his sophomore managing campaign in 1925, but his Senators dropped that year's Fall Classic; skippered Detroit Tigers twice and Boston Red Sox and Philadelphia Phillies for one year each, and late in his career was general manager of 1959–1960 Bosox; as second baseman (1919–1929 and 1931), led AL in double plays five times
November 9 – Fred Haney, 79, player, manager, executive and broadcaster; infielder in 622 games with four MLB clubs over seven seasons in the 1920s; as a manager, he helmed two horrible teams, the 1939–1941 St. Louis Browns and 1953–1955 Pittsburgh Pirates, finishing last five times in six years; in June 1956, he became skipper of the contending Milwaukee Braves and led them to the 1957 World Series championship, 1958 National League pennant, and 1959 NL tie-breaker series before stepping down; returning to his native Los Angeles, he was the first general manager of the expansion Angels and served from December 1960 through 1968; in between these assignments, he was radio play-by-voice for minor-league Hollywood Stars (1943–1948) and color man for NBC-TV Game of the Week (1960)
November 9 – Jack Ogden, 80, pitcher who appeared in 123 games in five seasons spanning 15 years (1918–1932) for the New York Giants, St. Louis Browns and Cincinnati Reds
November 16 – José Acosta, 86, Cuban pitcher whose 16-season professional career included 55 games pitched for the 1920–1922 Washington Senators
November 17 – Roger Peckinpaugh, 86, shortstop in 2,012 games for four American League teams between 1910 and 1927 who was named the 1925 league MVP in his last full season; starting shortstop of 1924 World Series champion Washington Senators; in 1914, at age 23, he became youngest manager in MLB history when on September 15 he was named interim pilot of the New York Yankees (leading them to a 10–10 record); later, served as manager (1928–1933 and 1941) and general manager (1941–1946) of Cleveland Indians
November 21 – Ron Willis, 34, relief pitcher who, in his official rookie season, helped lead the 1967 World Series champion St. Louis Cardinals to the NL pennant, topping Redbirds in games pitched (65), notching ten saves (second on the club), and posting a 2.67 ERA; overall appeared in 188 games (all in relief) over all or parts of five MLB seasons (1966–1970) for the Cardinals, Houston Astros and San Diego Padres
November 24 – Mayo Smith, 62, manager of the Philadelphia Phillies (1955–1958), Cincinnati Reds (1959) and Detroit Tigers (1967–1970) who led Detroit to the 1968 World Series title; posted a 663–613 lifetime record; an outfielder in his playing days who spent one year in majors, 1945, with wartime Philadelphia Athletics
November 25 – Andy Childs, 72, second baseman and pinch hitter in 22 games for Indianapolis (1937) and Memphis (1938) of the Negro American League
November 28 – Bob Meusel, 81, outfielder for the "Murderers' Row" New York Yankees of 1920–1929; batted over .300 seven times, including a career-high mark of .337 in 1927, hit for the cycle three times, appeared in six World Series (winning three rings), and led American League in home runs (33) and runs batted in (134) in 1925; brother of Irish Meusel
November 29 – George Herbert Walker Jr., 72, New York investment banker and minority owner of the Mets from their founding in 1961 until just before his death; uncle and a namesake of the 41st President of the United States

December
December 1 – Dobie Moore, 82, star shortstop for the Negro Leagues' Kansas City Monarchs (1920–1926) who batted .347 lifetime
December 3 – Bill Bonness, 53, southpaw pitcher who made two appearances for the 1944 Cleveland Indians
December 4 – Johnny Rizzo, 65, outfielder who played five seasons (1938–1942) for four National League clubs; knocked in 111 runs during his rookie year, trailing only Hall of Famers Joe Medwick and Mel Ott
December 7 – Denny Sothern, 73, center fielder who appeared in 357 games over five campaigns between 1926 and 1931 for the Philadelphia Phillies, Pittsburgh Pirates and Brooklyn Robins
December 8 – Art Ewoldt, 83, third baseman who played nine games for the 1919 Philadelphia Athletics
December 11 – Berith Melin, 59, outfielder, one of the original Rockford Peaches founding members of the All-American Girls Professional Baseball League in its 1943 inaugural season
December 18 – Leniel Hooker, 58, pitcher whose nine-year (1940–1948) career was spent almost entirely with the Newark Eagles; led Negro National League in winning percentage (.857) in 1942
December 26 – Al Mahon, 68, southpaw pitcher who appeared in three April and May contests for 1930 Philadelphia Athletics.
December 29 – Jimmy Brown, 67, infielder and leadoff hitter for the St. Louis Cardinals (1937–1943) and Pittsburgh Pirates (1946); member of 1942 World Series champions and 1943 National League All-Star; with his playing career essentially ended by World War II, he became an MLB coach and minor-league manager
December 30 – Halsey Hall, 79, longtime Minneapolis–Saint Paul sportswriter and broadcaster; after 27 years as radio voice of the minor-league Minneapolis Millers, joined broadcast team of relocated Minnesota Twins in 1961 and stayed through 1972

References